The Pembury Estate is a housing estate in the London Borough of Hackney in East London next to the Hackney Downs. The Pembury Estate consists of two sections: Old Pembury and New Pembury(divided into East and West) . Old Pembury consists of 24 1930s walk-up blocks. New Pembury consists of multiple 1960s maisonettes and bungalows, and the Pembury Circus development which is composed of 268 new homes. The Pembury Estate has approximately 1,500 to 2,000 residents. It is managed by the Peabody Trust.

The area saw violent protests during the 2011 England Riots.

Regeneration

A regeneration of the estate has been planned since 2011. In 2016, it was reported that an insufficient level of social housing was in the plan, falling 915 people short.

References

Housing estates in the London Borough of Hackney